Flatdal (lit. "Flat valley") is a village, parish and valley in the municipality of Seljord in Vestfold og Telemark, Norway. The lake Flatsjå has been partly drained to gain more land for agriculture.

Among notable people from Flatdal are painter Terje Grøstad, who settled in Flatdal, television presenter Hallvard Flatland, who was born in Flatdal in 1957, and novelist Helga Flatland, who grew up in Flatdal.

References

Villages in Vestfold og Telemark
Valleys of Vestfold og Telemark